Die Unzufriedene (German: The Discontented) was a German language weekly political magazine with a special reference to women. Its subtitle was unabhängige Wochenschrift für alle Frauen (German: independent weekly for all women) and its motto was "Human progress lies in discontent!". The magazine was in circulation between 1923 and 1944 in Vienna, Austria.

History and profile
Die Unzufriedene was founded by Max Winter and Paula Hons, and its first issue appeared on 22 September 1923. The Social Democratic Party was its publisher. Winter also edited the magazine until 1931 when Hons replaced him in the post. The magazine came out weekly and attempted to balance between political enlightenment of women and reporting news about fashion and entertainment. It adopted a social democratic political stance and was a supporter of feminism. The magazine asked children to report the abuse by their parents if they experience it. It sold over 150,000 in the early 1930s. 

In February 1934 Die Unzufriedene had to temporarily cease publication. On 1 July 1934 it resumed publication, but its editorial line changed radically. In addition, its title was changed to Das kleine Frauenblatt with the original subtitle, unabhängige Wochenschrift für alle Frauen. The magazine appeared with this title until 1944.

References

External links

1923 establishments in Austria
1944 disestablishments in Austria
Defunct magazines published in Austria
Defunct political magazines
Feminist magazines
German-language magazines
Magazines established in 1923
Magazines disestablished in 1944
Weekly magazines published in Austria
Women's magazines
Magazines published in Vienna